The Schwenkfelder Church is a small American Christian body rooted in the 16th-century Protestant Reformation teachings of Caspar Schwenkfeld von Ossig (1489–1561).

History
Although followers have held the teachings of Schwenckfeld since the 16th century, the Schwenkfelder Church did not come into existence until the 20th century, due in large part to Schwenckfeld's emphasis on inner spirituality over outward form. He also labored for a fellowship of all believers and one church.

Originally calling themselves Confessors of the Glory of Christ (after Schwenckfeld's 1541 book Great Confession on the Glory of Christ), the group later became known as Schwenkfelders. These Christians often suffered persecution like slavery, prison and fines at the hands of the government and state churches in Europe. Most of them lived in southern Germany and Lower Silesia.

By the beginning of the 18th century, the remaining Schwenkfelders lived around Harpersdorf in the Duchy of Silesia, which was part of the Bohemian Crown. As the persecution intensified around 1719–1725, they were given refuge in 1726 by Nicolaus Ludwig von Zinzendorf in Saxony. When the Elector of Saxony died in 1733, Jesuits petitioned the new ruler to return the Schwenkfelders to Harpersdorf. With their freedom in jeopardy, they decided to look to the New World; toleration was also extended to them in Silesia in 1742 by King Frederick II of Prussia.

The immigrant members of the Schwenkfelder Church brought saffron to the Americas; Schwenkfelders may have grown saffron in Europe—there is some record that at least one member of the group traded in the spice. A group came to Philadelphia, Pennsylvania, in 1731, and several migrations continued until 1737. The largest group, 180 Schwenkfelders, arrived in 1734. In 1782, the Society of Schwenkfelders was formed, and in 1909 the Schwenkfelder Church was incorporated. Though the Schwenkfelders thereafter remained largely confined to Pennsylvania, a small number later emigrated to Waterloo County in Ontario, Canada. The Schwenkfelder Church has remained small:  there are five congregations with about 2,500 members in southeastern Pennsylvania. All of these bodies are within a fifty-mile radius of Philadelphia: two in the city itself, and one each in East Norriton Township, Palm, and Worcester. The Schwenkfelder Church meets annually at a Spring General Conference. Sometimes Conferences are also held in the fall. The Society of the Descendants of the Schwenkfeldian Exiles is a related lineage society.

Characteristics
The Church teaches that the Bible is the source of Christian theology. Schwenckfeld drew his theology from the Old Testament and New Testament, and it is in agreement with the Apostles' Creed, the Nicene Creed, and the Confession of Chalcedon. The Church also recognizes the wisdom of church fathers, particularly those from the Eastern church as well as Augustine. Schwenckfeld emphasized the inner work of the Holy Spirit, conversion, which he called the rebirth, and the new man.

The Church also continues his belief that the Lord's Supper is a spiritual partaking representing the body and blood of Christ in open communion. Adult baptism and both infant baptism and consecration of infants is practiced depending on the church.

Adult members are also received into church membership through transfer of memberships from other churches and denominations. Their ecclesiastical tradition is congregational with an ecumenical focus. The Schwenkfelder churches recognize the right of the individual in decisions such as public service, armed combat, etc. Individual, autonomous congregations select ministers by a self-regulated search process. Schwenkfelder Ordination, Licensure and Authorization of Ministry is regulated by the Schwenkfelder Ministerium and the Executive Council of The Schwenkfelder Church.

Schwenkfeldian theology fits broadly within the parameters of Reformed theology today. Each congregation remains autonomous in theology and practice. Historic statements of faith inherited by the Christian Church as a whole—the Apostles' Creed, etc., along with a scriptural foundation—remain the best representative statement of Schwenkfeldian theology.

Society of the Descendants of the Schwenkfeldian Exiles 
The Society of the Descendants of the Schwenkfeldian Exiles is a lineage society for descendants of the 209 members of the Schwenkfelder Church who arrived near Penn's Landing between 1731 and 1737 and settled in Pennsylvania. It was founded in 1921 by William Wagener Porter and had an initial membership of 125 individuals. Publications include Exile Herald (1924–1954)  and Der Bericht (in English).

Further reading 
Formula for the Government and Discipline of the Schwenkfelder Church: Being a Part of the Church Manual (1911)
 Balthasar Heebner, Genealogical Record of the Descendants of the Schwenkfelders: Who Arrived in Pennsylvania in 1733, 1734, 1736, 1737 from the German (1879)
 Samuel Kriebel Brecht, Genealogical Record of the Schwenkfelder Families, Seekers of Religious Liberty Who Fled from Silesia to Saxony and thence to Pennsylvania in the Years 1731–1737 (1923)

References

 Encyclopedia of American Religions, edited by J. Gordon Melton
 Handbook of Denominations in the United States, by Frank S. Mead, Samuel S. Hill, and Craig D. Atwood
 Profiles in Belief: the Religious Bodies of the United States and Canada, by Arthur Carl Piepkorn

External links
 Schwenkfelder Church
 Central Schwenkfelder Church
 Schwenkfelder Library and Heritage Center
 Schwenkfelders - Global Anabaptist Mennonite Encyclopedia Online
 Schwenkfelders - An article from the United Church of Christ
 Schwenkfelders - Association of Religion Data Archives

Peace churches
Religious organizations established in 1782
Christian denominations founded in Germany
Protestant denominations established in the 18th century
United Church of Christ
1782 establishments in the Holy Roman Empire